Murder Ballads is the ninth studio album by Nick Cave and the Bad Seeds, released in 1996 on Mute Records. As its title suggests, the album consists of new and traditional murder ballads, a genre of songs that relays the details (and often consequences) of crimes of passion.

"Where the Wild Roses Grow", a duet featuring Cave singing with Kylie Minogue, was a hit single and received two ARIA Awards in 1996. Other prominent guest musicians on the album include PJ Harvey and Shane MacGowan.

Details 
Murder Ballads was the band's biggest commercial success to date, most likely helped by the unexpected repeated airplay of the "Where the Wild Roses Grow" video on MTV. MTV even nominated Cave for their "best male artist" award of that year, though this nomination was later withdrawn at Cave's request. Cave later said, "I was kind of aware that people would go and buy the Murder Ballads album and listen to it and wonder 'What the fuck have I bought this for?' because the Kylie song wasn't any true indication of what the record was actually like."

The first song written for the album was "O'Malley's Bar", when the band was recording Henry's Dream. According to Cave, the idea for the Murder Ballads album came from this song: "We couldn't use 'O'Malley's Bar' on any of our other records. So we had to make a record, an environment where the songs could exist." Recordings were done towards the end of the Let Love In sessions, and there was some thought that the early material could be made into a film with John Hillcoat. Cave said, "I was going around everywhere with letters of intent, pushing them at everyone I knew, saying 'Do you want to be in this film?'" For the TV documentary Great Australian Albums members described their work on Murder Ballads.

Songs 
 "Stagger Lee" is based on a traditional song about the African-American murderer of the same name. Cave's version draws most of the lyrics from a 1967 transcription published in the 1976 book The Life: The Lore and Folk Poetry of the Black Hustler, while the music itself is updated into a reggae song.
 "Death Is Not the End" includes vocalists Anita Lane, Kylie Minogue, PJ Harvey, and Shane MacGowan, along with Cave himself and Bad Seeds drummer Thomas Wydler and guitarist Blixa Bargeld. They each sing a verse in this cover of a Bob Dylan song, the only song in which an actual death does not occur. Cave later described it as, "just kind of a jokey little punctuation mark to the whole thing. There's tongue-in-cheek to that song, even though I think it's quite a beautiful rendition."

Reception 

Upon release, Murder Ballads received widespread critical acclaim. Bill van Parys of Rolling Stone wrote that "never before have manic elements elevated Cave's shtick to art as on Murder Ballads", describing the album as "literate, sultry and tortured" and "the performance of Nick Cave's life." Tony Scherman of Entertainment Weekly warned that Murder Ballads was "not for the squeamish," calling it "the rare pop record that resonates with the weight of the ages". In The New York Times, Neil Strauss felt that the album "is about more than storytelling", adding that Cave "meticulously creates a macabre fable and then distills it to a single image of death in much the way a photographer arranges a studio shoot". In a mixed review, Spins Chris Norris complimented the album's "sordid epics and dark confessionals", but felt that Cave's "rheumy Poe-ish romance" songs were less effective.

In the English music press, Selects Clark Collis remarked that Murder Ballads "weaves itself together into a meditation on death that is both beautiful and genuinely unnerving." Dave Henderson of Q observed that "musically, the Bad Seeds touch on tinkling cabaret jazz, country-paced morbidity and every morose station between." Murder Ballads ranked number 16 on Melody Makers list of 1996's Albums of the Year and number 7 in the NMEs 1996 critics' poll.

In December 2021, the album was listed at no. 13 in Rolling Stone Australia’s ‘200 Greatest Albums of All Time’ countdown.

Track listing

Personnel 
Nick Cave and the Bad Seeds
 Nick Cave – vocals (1–10), piano (1, 5, 8, 9), organ (1, 2, 4, 6, 10), Hammond (1), gun shots (2), string arrangement (5)
 Blixa Bargeld – guitar (1–8, 10), screams (2), vocals (10)
 Martyn P. Casey – bass (1–5, 7, 8)
 Mick Harvey – drums (1), guitar (2, 4, 5, 7, 10), acoustic guitar (3, 5), organ (3), wind organ (4), backing vocals (5), string arrangement (5), bass (6, 9), Hammond (8), space belt (8), percussion (9)
 Conway Savage – piano (2–4, 7, 10), backing vocals (5), organ (9)
 Jim Sclavunos – drums (2, 8), percussion (4, 10), bells (5), tambourine (6)
 Thomas Wydler – maracas (2), drums (3–7, 9, 10), tambourine (8), vocals (10)

Guest musicians
 PJ Harvey – vocals (3, 10)
 Terry Edwards – horns (4)
 Katharine Blake – additional vocals (4)
 Kylie Minogue – vocals (5, 10)
 Jen Anderson – violin (5)
 Sue Simpson – violin (5)
 Kerran Coulter – viola (5)
 Helen Mountfort – cello (5)
 Hugo Race – guitar (6)
 Warren Ellis – violin (6), accordion (6)
 Marielle Del Conte – additional vocals (7)
 Anita Lane – crying (7), vocals (10)
 Geraldine Johnston – additional vocals (8)
 Liz Corcoran – additional vocals (8)
 Shane MacGowan – vocals (10)
 Brian Hooper – bass (10)

The Moron Tabernacle Choir on "The Curse of Millhaven"
 Nick Cave
 Martyn P. Casey
 Conway Savage
 Thomas Wydler
 Warren Ellis
 Brian Hooper
 Spencer P. Jones
 Dave Graney
 Katharine Blake
 Clare Moore
 Rowland S. Howard
 James Johnston
 Ian Johnston
 Geraldine Johnston
 Astrid Munday

Charts

Weekly charts

Year-end charts

Certifications

 the album has sold close to a million copies worldwide.

References

Sources 
 The Life: The Lore and Folk Poetry of the Black Hustler, Wepman, Newman & Binderman, Holloway House, 1976, 

1996 albums
Nick Cave albums
Mute Records albums
Albums produced by Victor Van Vugt
Murder ballads